Steve Colavito (born August 9, 1951) is a former American football linebacker. He played for the Philadelphia Bell and Philadelphia Eagles in 1975.

References

1951 births
Living people
American football linebackers
Wesley Wolverines football players
Wake Forest Demon Deacons football players
Philadelphia Bell players
Philadelphia Eagles players
Cardinal Hayes High School alumni